Franz Dolp (June 6, 1936 – September 27, 2004) was an American economist and philanthropist best known for his efforts in reforesting 40 acres of cutover forestland in the Oregon Coast Range. After buying the land, he planted more than 10,000 cedar, hemlock and fir seedlings.

He earned a bachelor's degree in business administration from Yale University and a doctorate from the University of California, Berkeley. His thesis focused on farm labor in the Central Valley of California.

References 

1936 births
2004 deaths
Yale University alumni
University of California, Berkeley alumni